Ellora is one of the largest rock-cut monastery-temple cave complexes in the world, and a UNESCO World Heritage Site in Maharashtra, India.

Ellora may also refer to:

Ellora Symphony by Yasushi Akutagawa, dedicated to the Ellora Caves 
Ellora's Cave, an American independent erotic fiction publisher 
Ellora Patnaik (born 1968), Canadian film, stage and television actress